Bebedó is a village in Medio San Juan Municipality, Chocó Department in Colombia.

Climate
Bebedó has an extremely wet tropical rainforest climate (Af).

References

Populated places in the Chocó Department